Nanaji Sitaram Shamkule is a member of the 13th Maharashtra Legislative Assembly. He represents the Chandrapur Assembly Constituency. He belongs to the Bharatiya Janata Party (BJP). In May, 2013 he was appointed BJP's Maharashtra state SC cell. He was Member Legislative Assembly in 2009, also as a BJP member. Shamkule, before he became MLA in 2009, was a corporator in the Nagpur Municipal Corporation, from ward no 114, Takli Sim.

References

Maharashtra MLAs 2014–2019
Bharatiya Janata Party politicians from Maharashtra
Living people
People from Chandrapur
Maharashtra MLAs 2009–2014
Marathi politicians
Year of birth missing (living people)